Live at the North Sea Jazz Festival, 1980 may refer to:

Live at the North Sea Jazz Festival, 1980 (Oscar Peterson album)
Live at the North Sea Jazz Festival, 1980 (Freddie Hubbard album)